Textile fibers, threads, yarns and fabrics are measured in a multiplicity of units. 
 A fiber, a single filament of natural material, such as cotton, linen or wool, or artificial material such as nylon, polyester, metal or mineral fiber, or man-made cellulosic fibre like viscose, Modal, Lyocell or other rayon fiber is measured in terms of linear mass density, the weight of a given length of fiber. Various units are used to refer to the measurement of a fiber, such as: the denier and tex (linear mass density of fibers), super S (fineness of wool fiber), worsted count, woolen count, linen count (wet spun) (or Number English (Ne)), cotton count (or Number English (Ne)), Number metric (Nm) and yield (the reciprocal of denier and tex). 
 A yarn, a spun agglomeration of fibers used for knitting, weaving or sewing, is measured in terms of cotton count and yarn density. 
 Thread, usually consisting of multiple yarns plied together producing a long, thin strand used in sewing or weaving, is measured in the same units as yarn. 
 Fabric, material typically produced by weaving, knitting or knotting textile fibers, yarns or threads, is measured in units such as the momme, thread count (a measure of the coarseness or fineness of fabric), ends per inch (e.p.i) and picks per inch (p.p.i).

Fibers

Micronaire
Micronaire is a measure of the air permeability of cotton fiber and is an indication of fineness and maturity. Micronaire affects various aspects of cotton processing.

Micron

One millionth of a metre, or one thousandth of a millimetre; about one-fourth the width of a strand of spider silk.

Cotton Bale Size

Cotton lint is usually measured in bales, although there is no standard and the bale size may vary country to country. For example, in the United States it measures approximately 0.48 cubic metres (17 cubic feet) and weighs . In India, a bale equals .

S or super S number

Not a true unit of measure, S or super S number is an index of the fineness of wool fiber and is most commonly seen as a label on wool apparel, fabric, and yarn.

Slivers, tops and rovings

Slivers, tops and rovings are terms used in the worsted process. The sliver come off the card, tops come after the comb, rovings come before a yarn, and all have a heavier linear density.

Grams per metre
If the metric system is in use the linear density of slivers and tops is given in grams per metre. Tops destined for machine processing are typically 20 grams per metre. Hobby spinners typical use a little heavier top.

Yield
Similar to tex and denier, yield is a term that helps describe the linear density of a roving of fibers. However, unlike tex and denier, yield is the inverse of linear density and is usually expressed in yards per pound (yd/lb).

Yarn and thread

Twist

Twists per inch
Number of twists per inch.

Twists per metre
Number of twists per metre.

Linear density
There are two systems used for presenting linear density, direct and indirect. When the direct method is used, the length is fixed and the weight of yarn is measured; for example, tex gives the weight in grams of one thousand metres of yarn. An indirect method fixes the weight and gives the length of yarn created.

Units
The textile industry has a long history and there are various units in use. Tex is more likely to be used in Canada and Continental Europe, while denier remains more common in the United States. 

tex: Grams per 1,000 metres of yarn. Tex is a direct measure of linear density. 
den (denier): Grams per 9,000 metres of yarn. Den is a direct measure of linear density.
dtex (deci-tex): Grams per 10,000 metres of yarn. Dtex is a direct measure of linear density.
gr/yard:  Grains per yard of yarn. Gr/yard is a direct measure of linear density, but is rarely used in the modern textile industry.
ECC or NeC or Ne (English Cotton Count): The number of 840 yd lengths per pound. ECC is an indirect measure of linear density. It is the number of hanks of skein material that weighs 1 lb. Under this system, the higher the number, the finer the yarn. In the United States cotton counts between 1 and 20 are referred to as coarse counts.
NeK or NeW (Worsted Count): The number of 560 yd lengths per 1 lb of yarn. NeK is an indirect measure of linear density. NeK is also referred to as the spinning count.
NeL or Lea (Linen Count): The number of 300 yd lengths per 1 lb of yarn. NeL is an indirect measure of linear density.
NeS (Woollen Count or Yorkshire Skeins Woollen): The number of 256 yd lengths per 1 lb of yarn. NeS is an indirect measure of linear density. One of the best known of the many different woolen yarn counts.

Conversion table
The following table summarizes several measures of linear density and gives equivalences.

Denier

Denier or den (abbreviated D), a unit of measure for the linear mass density of fibers, is the mass in grams per 9000 metres of the fiber. The denier is based on a natural reference: a single strand of silk is approximately one denier; a 9000-metre strand of silk weighs about one gram. The term denier comes from the French denier, a coin of small value (worth  sou).

There is a difference between filament and total measurements in deniers. Both are defined as above, but the first relates to a single filament of fiber (commonly called denier per filament (DPF)), whereas the second relates to a yarn.

Broader terms, such as fine may be applied, either because the overall yarn is fine or because fibers within this yarn are thin. A 75-denier yarn is considered fine even if it contains only a few fibers, such as thirty 2.5-denier fibers; but a heavier yarn, such as 150 denier, is considered fine only if its fibers are individually as thin as one denier.

The following relationship applies to straight, uniform filaments:
DPF = total denier / quantity of uniform filaments

The denier system of measurement is used on two- and single-filament fibers. Some common calculations are as follows:

Generally a sample of 900 metres is weighed, and the result is multiplied by ten to obtain the denier weight.
A fiber is generally considered a microfiber if it is one denier or less.
A one-denier polyester fiber has a diameter of about ten micrometres.
In tights and pantyhose, the linear density of yarn used in the manufacturing process determines the opacity of the article in the following categories of commerce: ultra sheer (below 10 denier), sheer (10 to 30 denier), semi-opaque (30 to 40 denier), opaque (40 to 70 denier) and thick opaque (70 denier or higher).
For single fibers, instead of weighing, a machine called a vibroscope is used. A known length of the fiber (usually 20 mm) is set to vibrate, and its fundamental frequency measured, allowing the calculation of the mass and thus the linear density.

Yarn length
Given the linear density and weight the yarn length can be calculated; for example:

The following length units are defined.

Bundle: usually 
Thread: a length of —the circumference of a warp beam
Lea: 
Hank: a length of 7 leas or 
Spyndle: —used in the English rope industry

Fabrics

Grams per square metre (GSM)
Fabric weight is measured in grams per square metre or g/m2 (also abbreviated as GSM). GSM is the metric measurement of the weight of a fabric—it is a critical parameter for any textile product. The weight may affect density, thickness and many physical properties of the fabric, such as strength. GSM is accountable for the linear metres and specific use of the fabric. The fabric weight is measured in grams. In the metric system, the mass per unit area of all types of textiles is expressed in grams per square metre (g/m2). 

The gram (alternative spelling: gramme; SI unit symbol: g) is a metric system unit of mass. Square metre (alternative spelling: square meter; SI unit symbol: m2) is a superficial area equal to that of a square whose sides' lengths are each one metre.

Typically a cheap T-shirt fabric is approximately 150 g/m2. GSM of fabric helps in determining the consumption, cost and application. The more the gsm transposes to thicker and heavy construction.

Mommes
Mommes (mm), traditionally used to measure silk fabrics, the weight in pounds of a piece of fabric if it were sized 45 inches by 100 yards (1.2 m by 90 m). One momme = 4.340 g/m2; 8 mommes is approximately 1 ounce per square yard or 35 g/m2.

The momme is based on the standard width of silk of 45 inches (1.2 m) wide (though silk is regularly produced in 55-inch (1.4 m) widths and uncommonly in larger widths).

The usual range of momme weight for different weaves of silk are:
 Habutai—5 to 16 mm
 Chiffon—6 to 8 mm (can be made in double thickness, i.e. 12 to 16 mm)
 Crepe de Chine—12 to 16 mm
 Gauze—3 to 5 mm
 Raw silk—35 to 40 mm (heavier silks appear more "wooly")
 Organza—4 to 6 mm
 Charmeuse—12 to 30 mm

The higher the weight in mommes, the more durable the weave and the more suitable it is for heavy-duty use. Also, the heavier the silk, the more opaque it becomes. This can vary even within the same weave of silk: for example, lightweight charmeuse is translucent when used in clothing, but 30-momme charmeuse is opaque.

Thread count
Thread count, also called threadcount or threads per inch (TPI), is a measure of the coarseness or fineness of fabric. It is measured by counting the number of threads contained in one square inch of fabric or one square centimetre, including both the length (warp) and width (weft) threads. The thread count is the number of threads counted along two sides (up and across) of the square inch, added together. It is used especially in regard to cotton linens such as bed sheets, and has been known to be used in the classification of towels. There is a common misconception that thread count is an important consideration when purchasing bedding. However, linen experts claim that beyond a thread count of 400, there is no difference in quality. They further highlight that sheet material is of greater importance than thread count. The amount of thread that can fit into a square inch of fabric is limited, suggesting that bedding beyond 400 count is likely a marketing strategy. Inflated thread counts are usually the result of including the number of strands in a twisted yarn in the claimed thread count.

Industry standard
Thread count is often used as a measure of fabric quality, so that "standard" cotton thread counts are around 150 while "good-quality" sheets start at 180 and a count of 200 or higher is considered "percale". Some (but not all) extremely high thread counts (typically over 500) mislead as they usually count the individual threads in "plied" yarns (a yarn that is made by twisting together multiple finer threads). For marketing purposes, a fabric with 250 two-ply yarns in both the vertical and horizontal direction could have the component threads counted to a 1000 thread count although according to the National Textile Association (NTA), which cites the international standards group ASTM International, accepted industry practice is to count each thread as one, even threads spun as two- or three-ply yarn. The Federal Trade Commission in an August 2005 letter to the NTA agreed that consumers "could be deceived or misled" by inflated thread counts. In 2002, ASTM proposed a definition for "thread count" that has been called "the industry's first formal definition for thread count". A minority on the ASTM committee argued for the higher yarn count number obtained by counting each single yarn in a plied yarn and cited as authority the provision relating to woven fabric in the Harmonized Tariff Schedule of the United States, which states each ply should be counted as one using the "average yarn number." In 2017, the Federal Trade Commission issued a General Exclusion Order barring entry of woven textile fabrics and products marked with inflated thread counts. The inflated thread counts were deemed false advertising under section 43 of the Lanham Act, 15 U.S.C. 1125(a)(1)(B).

In tartans

In the context of tartans, thread counts are used not for determining coarseness, but rather for recording and reliably repeating the cross-striped pattern of the cloth. Such a thread count (which for the typical worsted woollen cloth used for a kilt must in total be divisible by 4) is given as a series of colour-code and thread-count pairs. Sometimes, with typical symmetrical (reflective) tartans, slash ( / ) markup at the ends is used to indicate whether (and how much of) a "pivot" colour is to be repeated when the design is mirrored and repeated backwards. For example,  calls for a pattern of (left to right) blue, white, blue, red, black, green, and white, and indicates that when mirrored the two white threads (going one direction) or 24 blue threads (going the other) are repeated after mirroring, resulting in a total of 4 white going rightward and 48 blue heading left. This is known as a half-count at pivot thread count. The same sett (technically a half-sett) could also be represented , in a full-count at pivot thread count; this indicates that after the four white threads, the pattern resumes backwards with 24 green without repetition of any of the white count. The old style, without slash markup——is considered ambiguous, but is most often interpreted as a full count. The comparatively rare non-symmetrical tartans are given in full setts and are simply repeated without mirroring.

Ends per inch
Ends per inch (EPI or e.p.i.) is the number of warp threads per inch of woven fabric. In general, the higher the ends per inch, the finer the fabric is. 

Ends per inch is very commonly used by weavers who must use the number of ends per inch in order to pick the right reed to weave with. The number of ends per inch varies on the pattern to be woven and the thickness of the thread. The number of times the thread can be wrapped around a ruler in adjacent turns over an inch is called the wraps per inch. Plain weaves generally use half the number of wraps per inch for the number of ends per inch, whereas denser weaves like a twill weave will use a higher ratio like two-thirds of the number of wraps per inch. Finer threads require more threads per inch than thick ones and thus result in a higher number of ends per inch.

The number of ends per inch in a piece of woven cloth varies depending on the stage of manufacture. Before the cloth is woven, the warp has a certain number of ends per inch, which is directly related to the size reed being used. After weaving, the number of ends per inch will increase, and it will increase again after being washed. This increase in the number of ends per inch (and picks per inch) and shrinkage in the size of the fabric is known as the take-up. The take-up depends on many factors, including the material and how tightly the cloth is woven. Tightly woven fabric shrinks more (and thus the number of ends per inch increases more) than loosely woven fabric, as do more elastic yarns and fibers.

Picks per inch
Picks per inch (or p.p.i.) is the number of weft threads per inch of woven fabric. A pick is a single weft thread, hence the term. In general, the higher the picks per inch, the finer the fabric is.

Courses and wales 
Loops are the building blocks of knitted fabrics, and courses and wales in knitted fabrics are importantly similar to ends and pick in woven fabrics. The knitting structure is formed by intermeshing the loops in consecutive rows.
 Courses are the total number of horizontal rows measured in per inch or per centimetre. The course is a horizontal row of loops formed by all the adjacent needles during one revolution. Course length is obtained by multiplying loop length with the number of needles involved in the production of the course.
 Wales are the number of vertical columns measured in per inch or per centimetre.
 Because the number of courses and wales per inch or per centimetre infers (more or less) the tight and loose knitting. Stitch or loop density is the total number of loops in a unit area such as per square centimetre or per square inch.
 Stitch/loop length is a major factor in a knitted fabric's overall quality, affecting dimensional stability, drape and appearance, etc. Loop length is the length of yarn contained to form a loop.

Air permeability
Air permeability is a measure of the ability of air to pass through a fabric. Air permeability is defined as "the volume of air in cubic centimetres (cm3) which is passed through in one second through 100 cm2 of the fabric at a pressure difference of 10 cm head of water", also known as the Gurley unit. It is standardized by, among others, norm ASTM D737-18 and norm ISO 9237-1995.

Factors that affect air permeability include porosity, fabric thickness and construction, yarn density, twist, crimp, layering, and moisture within the fabric.

The concept of air permeability is important for the design of active wear and insect netting.

References

Bibliography

External links

 Textiles Intelligence Glossary

Textiles
Units of measurement